Max Steel is an action/science fiction animated television series which originally aired from February 26, 2000 to January 15, 2002, based on the Mattel action-figure of the same name. Max Steel ran for three seasons, totaling thirty-five episodes.

From 2004 to 2012, direct-to-DVD movies kept the presence of the main character alive. However, the first movie (titled, Max Steel: Endangered Species) was the only movie to keep the continuity of the series. After Endangered Species, the continuity was altered. Endangered Species was the only movie to be made available in America, while later releases were in Latin America.

The voice-acting cast for the series included Chi McBride and Christian Campbell, as well as well-known sports stars, such as Tony Hawk.

After the bankruptcy of Netter Digital and Foundation Imaging, Mainframe Entertainment took over the productions of the third season and the movies. The last episode, "Truth Be Told", aired January 15, 2002. Max Steel was the first computer-generated series to air on Kids' WB.

A reboot series aired on Disney XD in 2013. However, characters and storylines were greatly altered.

Backstory
The protagonist, Josh McGrath (Campbell), is a 19-year-old fictional extreme sports teen star, whose parents died some time ago. He was later adopted by his father's best friend and partner, Jefferson Smith (McBride), who works in an extreme sports equipment manufacturing company which is in reality a façade for a secret counter-intelligence agency known as N-Tek.

One night, while Josh was visiting his stepfather at work, a villain known as Psycho (Szarabajka) broke into the facility. The young McGrath faced him and a brief battle ensued, interrupted when Psycho shot a nearby containment unit of semi-liquid, microscopic Nano-Tech machines called "Max Probes". The nanomachines covered Josh, entering his body, integrating with his organic system, and (as they ran out of energy) started dying, siphoning Josh's life-critical energy as well. In an attempt to save his foster son, Jefferson Smith agrees to submit Josh to a high proportion of the transphasic energy (T-Juice), which the machines need to survive. This saved his life and also gave him superhuman abilities. As a result, Josh took on the identity of Max Steel and fights super-powered villains, mainly Mr. Dread (Jarvis), Psycho's evil boss, and the members of DREAD, his spy organization. Later, in the movies, they fight off mutants, robots, mad scientists, and monsters.

Episodes

Max Steel debuted on Kids' WB with the episode "Strangers" on February 26, 2000, and ended with episode "Truth Be Told" on January 15, 2002.
The show ran for three seasons, totaling 35 episodes.

The series can be found on DVD: Volume one contains episodes 1–6,  contains episodes 7–13, and the final one is a box-set with all of season one. Seasons 2 and 3 were never released.
VHS ones were made available with various "Max Steel" action figures: "Strangers," "Snow Blind," "Sphinxes," and "Old Friend, New Enemy" were sold.

As of 2009, episodes of Max Steel can be found on Crackle's YouTube account, however, these are no longer accessible.
Transmitted ONTV series Max Steel for a predetermined time. In 2014, Tiin transmitted the series.

The series is available on Hulu in English and Spanish.

Characters

N-Tek and civilians
 Josh McGrath alias Max Steel (voiced by Christian Campbell from 2000 - 2002, Matthew Kaminsky in two episodes in 2001) – As Josh McGrath, he is a college student and an extreme sports star, working for his adoptive father, Jefferson Smith of N-Tek, which supplies such equipment. He later discovers that N-Tek is a front for a secret anti-terrorist organization. In the course of this discovery, he suffered an accident when he was doused with nanoprobes while battling Psycho. These probes gave him enhanced senses, ability to alter his appearance, turn invisible (dubbed, "Stealth mode!") and made him superhumanly-strong, agile, and fast (dubbed, "Going turbo!"), and to heal faster than a normal human being, but due to them integrating with his organic systems, he requires periodic doses of transphasic energy to survive or the probes will essentially starve to death and kill him. He uses this to take on the appearance of Max Steel, who looks very different from Josh McGrath, and join the fight against crime. His work in extreme sports and as a crime-buster often conflicts with college and his relationship with his girlfriend Laura Chen. As Josh, he has brown eyes and blonde hair. As Max, he has blue eyes and brown hair. In Max Steel: Countdown, Max would gain new nanoprobes, and a new system, Adrenalink, the more thrill Max did, the more power he would have, when he reached 100%, he enter Maximum Steel mode. Max would gain another upgrade in Max Steel vs the Mutant Menace. When Max went turbo, any N-Tek equipment he has on him would get upgraded, either in power, or allows the gear to have an alternate mode. Max’s original Bio-Link acted as a com-link, and monitored his turbo energy. It could also activate different clothes for Max for different environments. In Countdown, it was upgraded. While aesthetically it looked the same, the system was changed, It notifying Max’s Adrenalink percent level, and when he reached Maximum Steel. It also allows Max to create any N-Tek gear via voice command. In The Mutant Menace, the original Bio-Link was replaced by a new one. Actually a giant complex machine, using Nanotechnology the new Bio Link is shrunk, making it wearable. When Max goes Turbo, the new Bio-Link creates a bodysuit, safely allowing Max to use the new energy.
 Molly McGrath – Josh's mother died when he was just a toddler, in a shipwreck during a storm at sea while the family was on a pleasure trip. Molly makes a brief appearance without dialogue only once when the incident is mentioned in the episode "Sharks": Max is being haunted by her death, and, despite being only a toddler when she died, blames himself for her death. After this, she's never mentioned again. Besides being a lovely mother, there's no other information about her. 
 Jefferson Smith (voiced by Chi McBride from 2000 to 2002, Scott McNeil in Endangered Species) – The CEO of N-Tek, both the sports and spy sides. He inherited this position from Marco Nathanson, the previous and first CEO of N-Tek. He is the adoptive father of Max after his father died. Being an international counter-terrorism agency, N-Tek answers to the UN and includes a number of other non-US citizens on its staff. He voices his displeasure when Max is put in harm's way, but ultimately lets him go, knowing that Max is stronger than any human, and will be able to defeat enemies more easily than others. His relationship with Max is strained, but the two ultimately make amends.
 Dr. Roberto Martinez (voiced by Jacob Vargas from 2000 to 2002, Alessandro Juliani in Endangered Species) – A technical genius in his late teen years. Best known as 'Berto (a diminutive of his name), he is the main expert on Nano-Tek Max, the microscopic machines which gave Max Steel his superhuman abilities. 'Berto is usually based at the HQ of the secret intelligence service N-Tek where he monitors Max's missions via a computer screen, but he also often takes a more active part in the missions himself. He has family in Colombia, although how many relatives is unknown. From the moment they met, he and Josh became very close: Josh would call Roberto "Bro", who would respond with the Spanish version, "Hermano".
 Rachel Leeds (voiced by Shannon Kenny from 2000 to 2001) – Max's first partner at N-Tek. Although her country of origin is not specified, her accent indicates that she may be a British national. Rachel has a rather bossy personality but is very attractive in her own way. Much of  focused on her relationship with Max: from one of constant squabbling to increasing attraction on his part, which affected Josh's relationship with his girlfriend Laura Chen. At one stage Rachel did kiss Max as a way of calming him down when he was getting particularly agitated, but seemed to think that he ought to stick to Laura: one episode concludes with Rachel smiling and saying "Blessings on your union" in Chinese as Josh and Laura leave arm-in-arm. After the second series, Rachel was promoted and disappeared after three episodes. There is speculation that she has a brief, non-speaking appearance in season two, episode four, but it is also likely that it was just a reused model. She can normally handle herself in a fight even against multiple opponents bare handed, hence the reason why she was assigned to train and tutor Max as a new N-Tek Agent.
 Kat Ryan (voiced by Debi Mae West from 2000 to 2002, Meghan Black in Endangered Species) – After Rachel's promotion in season two, Kat, another of her protégés, became Max's new partner. At first they didn't get along, but, after Jefferson Smith forced them to work together, they developed a little mutual respect. About the same age as Josh and Roberto, her relationship with the two boys is like that of a sister, much like how Josh and 'Berto see each other as brothers. Kat was never given a surname until season three, and it was revealed in the second-to-last episode that, when she was younger, she was part of a street gang and did "very bad stuff." She did time in a juvenile detention center, and has since changed her ways.
 Laura Chen and Pete Costas (voiced by Lauren Tom and Thomas F. Wilson) – Two of Josh's college friends, Pete referring to themselves as "the Three Musketeers" given that they used to be very close, until Josh's life as Max Steel started to interfere. Laura Chen was Josh's girlfriend but she soon broke up with him due in part to his increasingly close relationship with Rachel Leeds. He also kept his activities as Max Steel a secret from her and this would affect dates and other commitments which made him somewhat unreliable. Even though she broke up with Josh, she sees & speaks to his alter-ego Max instead. Pete, in the season two premiere, found out about Josh's dual identity after being captured by John Dread and agreed to keep it secret. Yet he hitchhiked with him on one mission in Alaska once. He was not seen in season 3.
 Jean Mairot (voiced by Keith Szarabajka) – Smith's second-in-command at N-Tek in season one and head of operations, briefing agents on their missions and coordinating their progress. A soft-spoken man, he is cool and calculating and a good judge of character — putting Max in charge of a major rescue operation even though the boy himself did not feel up to it. At the end of season one, Mairot turned out to be a spy working for villain John Dread, N-Tek mainly winning because Dread kept underestimating Max. His fate is unknown, though it is presumed that he was caught in the explosion of Dread's base. Weisman also stated that Mairot did survive the explosion of Dread's base. Mairot spoke in a French accent.
 Charles "Chuck" Marshak (voiced by Edward Asner) – An N-Tek division chief who's in charge of Behemoth, the massive flying fortress used as a mobile base to support Max in the TV series. He's a senior, probably around 60 years old, who assists N-Tek with his expertise. He was a close friend of Big Jim and acts a bit fatherly with Max. Despite his age and butler-like appearance, he can move extremely fast, and is an experienced hand-to-hand combatant. He does not appear in season 2 or 3, with no explanation of where he went.
 Jake Nez (voiced by Gregg Rainwater) – N-Tek agent and astronaut, formerly from NASA. He was also once a love interest of Rachel's but was dumped by her when she started training Max. He does not come across as the jealous type, ably assisting Max and Rachel on missions.
Cytro- Cytro was originally a enemy robot created by Doctor Rendal in Max Steel: Bio Crisis, who was designed to kill Max. But over the course of the film Cytro grew to like Max, and sacrificed himself to save Max. Berto the rebuilt Cytro, as his memory core was still intact, and became the fourth and newest member of Team Steel.
Forge Ferris- Forge, or as he has Max call him Mr. Ferris, replaced Jefferson as the leader of all of N-Tek, during Max Steel vs The Mutant Menace While he is strict, he also encourages max not to give up, and gives him advice. He keeps Max on a need to know basis, but when Max does need to know, he always tells him. Why he does believe that mission always comes first, does understand that priorities change. This is best shown when complimented Max, when he chose to save a town from an out of control oil truck, rather than capture Toxizon. In Max Steel: Monstrous Alliance, it is revealed he has a daughter, named Jet.
Jet Ferris- Jet is the daughter of Forge Ferris, who  debuted in Max Steel: Monstrous Alliance. Jet was described by Forge as a constant source of disappointment, as Jet keeps getting demerits, and keeps being unable to graduate. Jet originally planned on killing Toxion to try and make he father proud, but after her adventure with Max and Cytro, which she secretly sneaks into, she takes Toxion be to the N-Tek lab in the North Pole, and is able to cure him, finally earning her father’s respect.

DREAD
 John Dread (voiced by Martin Jarvis) – The leader of the DREAD organization, and the main antagonist of the first and second seasons (even after his supposed death). He's rarely seen outside of offices and rooms in dark secluded buildings, and only made two known appearances where he was the main or part of a main threat. He was killed in the  finale (S1E13 – "Shattered") when his airship crashes, but he survived in the  premiere (S2E1 – "The Return"). He takes Pete Costas hostage and forces Max to steal valuable N-Tek research. He's later arrested and held in a maximum security prison. During the  finale (S2E13 – "Breakout"), Psycho and Bio-Con break him out while he is being transferred to another prison. It is believed he was killed off later in the same episode, but no body was found. There is fandom speculation that John Dread and Marco Nathanson (the N-Tek founder) are the same person, although this has been debunked by the first season story editor Greg Weisman.
 Psycho (voiced by Keith Szarabajka, Brian Drummond in Endangered Species) – His real name is unknown, although his nickname/DREAD code-name is speculated to come from the fact that he appears to be a psychopath. He's often called "Smiley", mainly by Max but occasionally by other members of N-Tek. He ignores it when Max refers to him as smiley, but usually has very violent reactions when other members of DREAD address him with that nickname. He has a metallic face which looks like the human skull, with an unusually large smiling jaw (hence the reason of his nickname). In the first season, Psycho covers up his metallic face with a mask, which gives him the appearance of a normal tough white guy. His main weapon is his right bionic arm, which can change into a claw or a laser gun, presumably by nerve signals. In Endangered Species, Psycho also has a Psycho-droid, which looks almost exactly like him, except the droid is a silver or copper color. He features the same bionic arm as Psycho and has a self-destruct system, which Psycho ultimately uses to kill Bio-Con.
 L'Etranger (voiced by John de Lancie) – "The Stranger," as his name translates from French into English. He wears a mask over his face, which appears to resemble a metal skull (similar to that-of Psycho), with little facial details, and was the first villain to appear in the TV show. At the end of said episode, Dread mentions that he is not a full-time member of his organization. By the time of his second appearance, he is said to no longer work for Dread. He is a mercenary terrorist with strength that rivals Max’s in turbo-mode and armed with electrical charged gloves which can produce an explosive spark. Being an electrical weapon, one hit is more than enough to stun his enemies for a large period of time. It appears that he drowned in the episode "Fun in the Sun" (S2E2).
 Dragonelle (voiced by Mia Korf) – She is the first major female villain shown. The origin of her code-name is unclear, although there is speculation that she comes from China (as that is where the episode which she appeared in for the first time took place). As dragons are a key part of Chinese mythology, it is believed that she took this name for good luck. She's dressed in golden battle armor, and has the ability to perfectly mimic the actions and appearance of any person she has seen. She's not much of a fighter, as she always runs away from any physical confrontation, since she's more an undercover agent than an active fighter. Nevertheless, she fights off both Max and 'Berto in the episode "Shooting Stars" (S2E8).  Dragonelle is genuinely loyal to Dread, believing him to be “a genius” and is penitent when she fails him.
 Vitriol – According to Max, Vitriol is "not the sharpest tool in the shed," which explains why he often teams along with Psycho. While they are supposed to be equal members of DREAD, Vitriol usually follows Psycho's orders. His arms are vibrant, translucent green with metallic 'bones' visible, and can shoot green energy beams, which can be very destructive. At the end of season one, he realizes he's an expendable pawn, and decides to cooperate with N-Tek in an effort to obtain a reduced sentence. In , he is seen several times as the main enemy.

Other villains
 Woody Barkowski (voiced by Jeff Bennett) and Annabelle Barkowski/Electrix (voiced by Susan Eisenberg) – Two siblings who are intent on bringing down N-Tek: Woody because he believes that they gave him a faulty mountain bike to cause him to break his leg and thus retire from the extreme sports world. Woody considers himself to be Max Steel's nemesis, but Max mentions that he "barely qualifies as comic relief." Annabelle collaborates with her brother in the first season and seeks revenge for her brother in the second season. In season two, Annabelle suffers an accident in her laboratory and her body is never found. It is later revealed that Annabelle's body using electrical currents and sources as an energy supply, much like how the nanoprobes in Max's body uses transphasic energy. She adopts the name as Electrix and has several robots to act as her reinforcements.
 Bio-Con (voiced by René Auberjonois, Scott McNeil in Endangered Species) – His full name is Bio-Constrictor and short for "Biologically Altered Constricting Serpent", having been given this name by 'Berto. Dr. David Klimo was involved in an accident and is thought to have been injected with electrified snake venom, and thus mutated into a half-human, half reptile with the abilities to turn into a snake, poison people with highly-toxic venom or use his venom to transform other people into copies of his mutated self. Bio-Con looks more like a leather mummy than a snake, mostly because his body is composed of several serpents twisted around what seems to be his base skeleton. Before his accident, he was N-Tek an employee fired for erratic behavior, mainly due to the use of turning poisonous animals, such as scorpions and snakes, into biological weapons, which appears to form a basis of the plotline of the Endangered Species movie. Towards the end of Endangered Species, Psycho betrays him, and kills him with a self-destructing android. He initially met Josh when he was younger, and they used to play baseball together.
Elementor- (voiced by Scott McNeil) Elementor is a clone of Bio-Con, who first appeared in Max Steel: Forces of Nature, creating by using one of the five Elementium Isotopes, which gave him the ability to control water. He later found and absorbed 3 that had been scattered around the world, giving him control over earth, fire and air, and the ability to absorb other materials, like metal, sand, ice etc. and needed  the last on, and attacked N-Tek. Elementor’s plan was to use the isotopes to kill all life on the planet and restart it from scratch. He’s defeated by Max, which it was revealed that the fifth isotope was used in order his body to not reject the nanoprobes. And used its energy to separate and kill Elementor. However in Max Steel: Countdown, Elementor was still alive, but lacking a body. He tried to use the same energy that Max uses to restore his body, but was split into his five forms, Earth, Wind, Water, Fire and Metal. Who then went to merge with the earth on a global scale. Max was able to fuse all of the Elementors back into one, and severely drain him of his powers. Despite being a clone of Bio-Con, Elementor isn’t the brightest bulb in the bunch. 
 Lance Breamer – He considers himself the "King of the sky." Angered by those who feel his ideas are too expensive or too impractical, Lance creates a massive airplane called, "The Javelin." Lance uses this to steal aircraft out of the sky, using fog exhibitors to conceal the plane, and knockout gas to wipe out a part of the pilot's short-term memory. After N-Tek use their plane, the Behemoth, as bait, Lance manages to abduct the plane with 'Berto inside. He takes a liking to 'Berto, and attempts to have 'Berto join him. After 'Berto refuses to destroy a plane, Lance lashes out, firing the Javelin's lasers at innocent bystanders. Shortly thereafter, Max boards the Javelin. Lance fights Max, but is knocked out and presumably arrested.
 Hernando Carreras – The leader of the so-called pirates in Baja. He only appears in the episode "Swashbucklers". He has a mechanical eye under his eyepatch which can shoot lasers, and his men use laser swords. He plans to use an earthquake machine to find buried treasure so that they'll be rich.
 Bret Grimsley – Grimsley is the sports manager for athletes Brian Durham and Danny Preston. Grimsley uses Brian and Danny to steal high-end computer chips, promising they'll be the best. The computer chips, when attached to the head of a person, can push their body to the extreme. They are extremely dangerous, and have the potential to kill Brian or Danny. Grimsley doesn't care about this, only thinking of profits and being . Max catches Brian and Danny, and they confess, leaving Grimsley behind bars.
 Clark Ashworth – Clark is an egotistical, megalomaniac who takes his former coworkers hostage after he is fired from his job in Washington, D.C. While holding them hostage, he steals his "prized creation": The Disruptor. The Disruptor has the equivalent of 50 sticks of dynamite each time it is fired, as well as unlimited firing capabilities. Clark created this, as well as the security system for the building he is holding his former coworkers hostage in, making it difficult for Max and Kat to save the hostages and stop Clark. After Max and Clark struggle, he escapes the building, and heads towards the Washington Monument, in an attempt to fire the Disruptor and destroy the White House. Max stops him, and he is arrested. He is known for using the term, "Dude" quite frequently, and Max states he looks more like a surfer than a terrorist.
 Richard Shine – Shine is a sports park owner, and is extremely obsessed with Kat. He attempts to destroy his own sports park to make millions, and later kidnaps Kat after she is injured in an explosion he caused. Max is almost blown up by one of Shine's bombs in an apartment, but Max escapes with the bomb and tosses it into the ocean before it goes off. Max and 'Berto track down one of Shine's mansions, and rescue Kat. Shine attempts to stop them with his henchmen, but they are all taken down and arrested.
 Serge De La Rouge – Serge is a car racer who holds a grudge against athlete Jeremy McGrath because he lost to him in the last Sahara Race: a race across the Sahara Desert where any type of vehicle goes. Serge plants a bomb in his own car, kidnaps Jeremy during the race, and attempts to kill Jeremy as well as the judges who overruled his protests that the last part of the race favored super cross bikers. Max, Kat, and 'Berto manage to stop and arrest Serge before anyone is harmed.
 Chang – Chang is an expert in martial arts and leader of the Chinese Cyber Dragon Tong.
 Dexter – He kidnapped and brainwashed Scott to kill Montgomery. Max and Kat manage to stop him and arrest him.
Exstroyer- (Voiced by Brian Drummond) Originally known as Troy Winters and debuted in Max Steel: Dark Rival, Troy was Max’s rival on the Extreme Sports Circuit, and the only guy Max couldn’t beat. Troy left to work for Eclipse Industries, as the Circuit couldn’t proved the challenge Troy wanted. He stole three Proton Magnets from N-Tek, and used them to shoot down crystal pieces from a comet called Morphosos. Troy fell into a pool of lava, and merged the Morphosos Crystal he had on him, and merged with it, becoming Exstroyer. Max defeated him, and sent him into deep space on the comet, in Max Steel: Bio Crisis, a Exstroyer clone was created with the powers and memories of the original. Exstroyer has the ability to drain the energy of anyone or anything, and turn himself in a super charged copy of it. Any person or creature, can sometimes become infected, and gain Crystal’s similar to Exstroyer’s. Also, like Exstroyer, the infected can into a super charged version of anything they touch. 
Toxion- Originally an N-Tek agent known as Tox who debuted in Max Steel vs The Mutant Menace. He had a problem with authority and tried to bring an N-Tek waste containment plant, that he created in order to hold the world’s most dangerous substances, online before it was ready. The result was an explosion that mutated Tox’s body, and gave him control over toxins, and other dangerous chemicals. It also mutated Toxion’s mind, causing him to go crazy, and blamed N-Tek for what happened to him. Before Toxion grew too powerful  however, he was placed in a containment Sphere of ultra purified water, and sent to the North Pole until a cure could be found. Toxion tricked Max into freeing him, and proceeded to strengthen himself. He then tried to absorb the substances from the containment plant, and was stopped by Max. In Max Steel: Monstrous Alliance, he tried to take over a new N-Tek ship called the Warden. At the end of the film he was cured by Forge Ferris’s daughter, Jet.
Makino- Originally known as Mike Nickelson he debuted in Makino’s Revenge. Nickelson stole Berto’s equipment in order to try and record a fight between Max and Lightning Elementor, he was hit by a substance that fused him and Berto’s equipment. He used his new powers to make Max and N-Tek look like criminals, and promote himself as a hero. But Makino’s deception was revealed, and lost his fame, and credibility. Makino has the power to control all technology, he can also change his body be absorbing different vehicles such as a tank or jet fighter.

Principal voice actors
 Edward Asner – Charles "Chuck" Marshak (2000)
 Christian Campbell – Max Steel/Josh McGrath (2000–2001)
 Martin Jarvis – John Dread
 Matthew Kaminsky – Max Steel/Josh McGrath (2001, episodes "Prey" and "Fan Appreciation")
 Shannon Kenny – Rachel Leeds (2000)
 Mia Korf – Dragonelle (2000)
 John de Lancie – L'Etranger
 Chi McBride – Jefferson Smith
 Keith Szarabajka – Jean Mairot, Psycho
 Jacob Vargas – Dr. Roberto Martinez
 Debi Mae West – Kat Ryan (2001 - 2002)

Additional voices
 Thom Adcox-Hernandez
 Carlos Alazraqui
 Rob Paulsen
 Edward Albert - 
 Obba Babatundé
 Jeff Bennett - Woody Barkowski, additional voices
Susan Eisenberg - Annabelle Barkowski/Electrix
 Earl Boen
 Robert Cait
 Cam Clarke
 Steve Blum
 Jesse Corti
 Jim Cummings
 Candi Milo
 David DeLuise
 Tate Donovan
 Jessica Gee
 Jean Gilpin
 Michael Gough – Grimsley
 Tony Hawk – Himself
 Matt Hoffman – Himself
 Sherman Howard
 Charity James
 Dublin James
 Tony Jay
 Clyde Kusatsu
 Joe Lala
 Jason Marsden - Joseph Guerard
 Jeremy McGrath – Himself
 Candi Milo
 Yuji Okumoto
 August Paro
 Gregg Rainwater – Jake Nez
 Kevin Michael Richardson
 Mark Rolston
 Rino Romano
 Pete Sepenuk
 James Sie
 Tony Pope
 Cynthia Songé 
 Tara Strong
 Michael T. Weiss

Crew
 Susan Blu – Dialogue Director
 Bob Richardson – Producer, Supervising Director

Series ending and continuity

After the official ending of the original series, due to the success of the action figure in Latin America, but the lack of response from United States market, Mattel removed Max Steel from  the American market and focused on foreign markets only. As a result, after two years of absence, in partnership with Mattel, Sony Family Pictures Entertainment and Mainframe Entertainment (now Rainmaker Animation) continued with the animated adventures of Max Steel as a series of Direct to DVD movies and a collection of 1 minute video clips. Each movie or clip usually presents Max challenging one of his enemies, and was used initially as a way to keep the presence of Max on TV, but eventually became a way to promote a series of new toys.

After their initial release on TV, the movies were included as bonus gifts in many Max Steel toys or rewards for other activities related to the toy series. Most of the TV ads were grouped under the name of Turbo Missions.

Reboot

In January 2012, it was reported Mattel and Freemantle Media were working on a new television series and reboot of the Max Steel television series, which will still retain the name, but feature different characters, villains, and an entirely new storyline.
This time, the show follows a 16-year-old Tachyon-human hybrid named Maxwell "Max" McGrath and his alien "Ultralink" partner, Steel.
Maxwell McGrath learns he has the power to generate "TURBO energy", which he struggles to contain until meeting Steel. Steel gives Maxwell the ability to harness his power while merging his own to create one unified super force. The action adventure series was launched on March 1, 2013 to audiences on Cartoon Network channels throughout Latin America, including Mexico, Brazil, Peru and Argentina.
On October 5, 2012, it was confirmed that the series will air on Disney XD in the United States. Max Steel premiered Monday, March 25, 2013.

References

External links
 

Television series by Sony Pictures Television
2000s American animated television series
2000 American television series debuts
2002 American television series endings
2000s Canadian animated television series
2000 Canadian television series debuts
2002 Canadian television series endings
American computer-animated television series
Canadian computer-animated television series
American children's animated science fiction television series
American children's animated superhero television series
Canadian children's animated science fiction television series
Canadian children's animated superhero television series
Cyborg superheroes
English-language television shows
Kids' WB original shows
 
Television shows based on Mattel toys
Fictional super soldiers
Espionage television series
Teen animated television series
Teen superhero television series
Television series by Adelaide Productions
Television series by Mattel Creations
Television series by Rainmaker Studios